March Madness usually refers to the NCAA Division I men's basketball tournament; it also refers to:

Sports
NCAA Division I women's basketball tournament, American college basketball
NCAA March Madness (TV program), the branding used for television coverage of the men's tournament
NCAA Basketball series (formerly March Madness series), a video game series
Mega March Madness, a defunct pay-per-view television package covering the men's tournament
Illinois High School Boys Basketball Championship, a high-school basketball tournament

Other uses
 "March madness", the main part of the breeding season of the European hare
"March Madness" (song), by Future, 2015
March Mammal Madness, a simulated competition among non-human mammals